Municipal elections were held in France on 11 and 18 June 1995, more or less than one month after Jacques Chirac's election.

The far-right National Front elected 3 mayors in Provence: Toulon, Orange, Marignane. It was the first time the far-right led an executive alone. In other races, Jean Tiberi (RPR) succeeded Jacques Chirac as Mayor of Paris. In Marseille, the UDF-Republican Jean-Claude Gaudin succeeded the socialist Gaston Defferre. In Lyon, former UDF Prime Minister Raymond Barre succeeded to another right-wing incumbent mayor.

Results

Sources

Locals 1995

1995
1995 elections in France